Mohammed Nuaman Abdelfatah Saleh (born 18 July 1993) is a Palestinian professional footballer who plays as a defender for Egyptian Premier League club Eastern Company.

Club career
Defender Mohammed Saleh played with Ahli Al-Khaleel, before joining Floriana in Malta for a one-year contract.

International career
Mohammed Saleh forms part of the Palestine national football team.

Honours
Ahli Al-Khaleel
 Palestine Cup: 2016–17
 West Bank Premier League runner-up: 2017–18

References

External links
 
 

1993 births
Living people
People from Gaza City
Palestinian footballers
Association football defenders
Ahli Al-Khaleel players
Floriana F.C. players
Al Masry SC players
West Bank Premier League players
Maltese Premier League players
Egyptian Premier League players
Palestinian expatriate footballers
Palestinian expatriate sportspeople in Malta
Palestinian expatriate sportspeople in Egypt
Expatriate footballers in Malta
Expatriate footballers in Egypt
Palestine international footballers
2019 AFC Asian Cup players
Gaza Strip Premier League players